Crivitz Municipal Airport,  is a city owned public use airport located 3 miles (5 km) southwest of the central business district of Crivitz, Wisconsin, a city in Marinette County, Wisconsin, United States. It is included in the Federal Aviation Administration (FAA) National Plan of Integrated Airport Systems for 2021–2025, in which it is categorized as a basic general aviation facility.

Although most airports in the United States use the same three-letter location identifier for the FAA and International Air Transport Association (IATA), this airport is assigned 3D1 by the FAA but has no designation from the IATA.

Facilities and aircraft 
Crivitz Municipal Airport covers an area of 147 acres (60 ha) at an elevation of 735 feet (224 m) above mean sea level. It has two runways: 18/36 is 2,164 by 60 feet (660 x 18 m) with an asphalt surface and 9/27 is 2,545 by 80 feet (776 x 24 m) with a turf surface.

For the 12-month period ending June 24, 2020, the airport had 200 aircraft operations: 100% general aviation.
In January 2023, there were no aircraft based at this airport.

See also
List of airports in Wisconsin

References

External links 
 

Airports in Wisconsin
Buildings and structures in Marinette County, Wisconsin